Mama's Boy is a 2007 American comedy-drama film starring Diane Keaton and Jon Heder, and features music by Mark Mothersbaugh. The film was distributed by Warner Bros. for a limited release to certain regions of the United States. Mama's Boy was directed by Tim Hamilton.

Plot summary
Eccentric Jeffrey Mannus (Jon Heder) is 29 years old and lives with his mother, Jan (Diane Keaton). He sees no reason to alter this arrangement, but his perfect world is upended when Jan meets Mert Rosenbloom (Jeff Daniels), a motivational speaker. Mert successfully woos Jan and moves in on Jeffrey's territory, something Jeffrey will not tolerate. While at a coffee shop, Jeffrey finds a friend in one of the workers, aspiring singer-songwriter Nora Flannagan (Anna Faris). Later, Jeffrey enlists her aid as his unlikely ally. As the war between Mert and Jeffrey escalates, something unprecedented happens — slowly, to both his own surprise and horror, Jeffrey discovers his inner self. However, before this happens, Jeffrey and Mert get into a fist fight in Jan's home, causing her to break up with Mert. Jeffrey is pleased, but Jan kicks him out of the house. He goes to find Nora, who is currently upset with him for being such a "jerk", and Nora does not offer any help. Jeffrey lives on the streets, but is eventually arrested for urinating in a sink. Seymour comes to the rescue and pays his bail, also allowing him to move in with him. Jeffrey realizes his errors and fights to get Jan and Mert back together. After achieving this, he goes to stop the bus that Nora is travelling on, as she is leaving for college, in his new car. He parks it in the middle of the road and stands on the hood, holding up a radio that is playing one of Nora's favorite songs. The bus driver makes Nora talk to him and they make up. They then drive off into the distance.

Cast
Jon Heder - Jeffrey Mannus
Diane Keaton - Jan Mannus
Jeff Daniels - Mert Jacob Rosenbloom
Anna Faris - Nora Flannagan
Sarah Chalke - Maya
Dorian Missick - Mitch
Eli Wallach - Seymour Warburton
Mary Kay Place - Barbera
Simon Helberg - Rathkon

Reception
The film was greatly panned by critics, receiving a Rotten Tomatoes critic score of 8% based on 11 reviews, with an average rating of 3.4/10.

The film made $618,145 in foreign markets.

References

External links

2007 films
Warner Bros. films
Fortissimo Films films
2007 comedy-drama films
Films scored by Mark Mothersbaugh
American comedy-drama films
2007 directorial debut films
2007 comedy films
2007 drama films
2000s English-language films
2000s American films